The Pabellón de la Fama del Caribe (In English, the Caribbean Baseball Hall of Fame) was established in 1996 by Juan Francisco Puello Herrera, commissioner of the Confederación de Béisbol del Caribe (Caribbean Confederation of Professional Baseball).

It honors the most prominent baseball players who have made significant achievements in the Caribbean Series, as well as efforts to honor people who have contributed to the development of Caribbean baseball.

In February each year, during the course of the Series, the winners are voted in by journalists, radio and television broadcasters, as well as baseball historians from Mexico, Puerto Rico, Venezuela and the Dominican Republic. Each nominee has to receive at least the minimum seventy-five percent of votes to secure his enshrinement in the Hall, just like it is for the Major Leagues.

Since 2009, the prize is awarded to personalities born in the host country of the Series.

List of inductees

1996

1998

1999

2000

2001

2002

2003

2004

2005

2006

2007

2008

2009

2010

2011

2012

2013

2014

2015

2016

See also
Baseball awards #Americas

References

Awards established in 1996
Baseball museums and halls of fame
Caribbean sportspeople
Caribbean Series
Lists of baseball players